Delete and Roll is a jazz fusion album by BPM, featuring drummer Terry Bozzio, saxophonist Gerald Preinfalk, and guitarist Alex Machacek. It was recorded in 2001, and was released in 2002 by Next Generation Enterprises.

Reception
In a review for All About Jazz, Helmut Koch called the recording "an excellent crossover album at the fringe of jazz, fusion, avant-garde prog-rock and their numerous sub-genres," and wrote: "Delete and Roll is out and out off-mainstream, an interesting and adventurous amalgam of various musical influences and a brave statement of non-conformist creativity in general."

Modern Drummer'''s Mike Haid stated: "You'll find lots of notes on BPM's Delete and Roll'', all of them splattered about lengthy and complex Zappa-style compositions... Bozzio shines as he goes deep into his huge kit."

Track listing
"Dicht" (Machacek) - 8:38
"Strafe" (Machacek) - 8:18
"Austin Powers" (Machacek) - 8:09
"Invisible" (Preinfalk) - 5:42
"Aug Um Aug" (Machacek/Preinfalk) - 10:00
"Bulgarianish Folkdance" (Bozzio) - 3:00
"I Remember Edison" (Machacek/Preinfalk) - 8:27
"S150" (Machacek) - 9:01
"What She Never Heard" (Bozzio) - 2:21

Personnel
Gerald Preinfalk – bass clarinet, alto saxophone, soprano saxophone
Alex Machacek – electric guitar, guitar synthesizer
Terry Bozzio – drums, percussion

References 

2002 albums
BPM (band) albums